is a former Japanese football player.

Playing career
Kusano was born in Iwaki on April 2, 1970. After graduating from Sendai University, he joined Yokohama Flügels in 1993. On March 23, 1994, he debuted against Nagoya Grampus Eight. However he could only play this match and he moved to Japan Football League (JFL) club Kashiwa Reysol in June. The club won the 2nd place in 1994 and was promoted to J1 League. In 1996, he moved to his local club Brummell Sendai in JFL. He retired end of 1997 season.

Club statistics

References

External links

1970 births
Living people
Sendai University alumni
Association football people from Fukushima Prefecture
Japanese footballers
J1 League players
Japan Football League (1992–1998) players
Yokohama Flügels players
Kashiwa Reysol players
Vegalta Sendai players
Association football forwards